Line 14 of the Shanghai Metro is an east-west metro line opened on 30 December 2021. Due to Line 14 cutting across some of the densest areas of Shanghai and being a relief line for line 2, high ridership is expected for the line. As such the line uses high capacity 8 car A size trains similar to lines 1 and 2. The line uses an automatic train control system jointly developed by Thales and Shanghai Electric. Line 14 is fully driverless. The line is colored olive on system maps.

History
Environmental evaluations began on January 2, 2014. On November 29, 2014, construction began on a section in Pudong New Area.

The line was originally scheduled to open in 2020, but its opening was delayed to 30 December 2021. Longju Road station has not been opened yet, due to problems with land acquisition process.

Stations

Service routes
{|border=1 style="border-collapse: collapse;" class="mw-collapsible"
! colspan="11" style="text-align: center" bgcolor=# | 
|-
| colspan="11" style="text-align: left" | 
 M - Mainline:  ↔ 
 P - Partial mainline:  ↔ 
|-bgcolor=#
! rowspan="1" colspan="2" |
! colspan="2" | 
! rowspan="2" | 
! colspan="3" rowspan="1" | 
! rowspan="2" | 
! rowspan="2" | 
|-bgcolor=#
! rowspan="1" |  || 
! 
! 
! colspan="2" |
! 
|-
|align="center"|● ||
|
|
|
|0.0
|0.0
|0
|rowspan="6"|Jiading
|rowspan="23"| 30 Dec 2021
|-
|align="center"|● || 
| 
|
|
|1.61
|1.61
|2
|-
|align="center"|● || 
|
|
|
|1.65
|3.26
|4
|-
|align="center"|● || 
|
|
|
|1.55
|4.81
|7
|-
|align="center"|● || 
| 
|
|
|1.41
|6.22
|9
|-
|align="center"|● ||align="center"|●
|
|
|
|1.24
|7.46
|11
|-
|align="center"|●||align="center"|●
|
|
|
|1.00
|8.46
|13
|rowspan="6"|Putuo
|-
|align="center"|●||align="center"|●
|
|
|
|1.31
|9.77
|15
|-
|align="center"|●||align="center"|●
|
|
|
|0.92
|10.69
|17
|-
|align="center"|●||align="center"|●
|
|
|
|0.90
|11.59
|20
|-
|align="center"|●||align="center"|●
|
|
|   
|1.10
|12.69
|22
|-
|align="center"|●||align="center"|●
|
|
|
|1.05
|13.74
|24
|-
|align="center"|●||align="center"|●
|
|
|
|0.97
|14.71
|26
|rowspan="2"|Jing'an
|-
|align="center"|●||align="center"|●
|
|
| 
|1.03
|15.74
|28
|-
|align="center"|●||align="center"|●
|
|
|
|3.07
|18.81
|32
|rowspan="3"|Huangpu
|-
|align="center"|●||align="center"|●
|
|
|
|0.71
|19.52
|34
|-
|align="center"|●||align="center"|●
|
|
|
|0.74
|20.26
|36
|-
|align="center"|●||align="center"|●
|
|
|
|1.60
|21.86
|39
|rowspan="14"|Pudong
|-
|align="center"|●||align="center"|●
|
|
|
|1.01
|22.87
|41
|-
|align="center"|●||align="center"|●
|
|
|
|0.74
|23.61
|43
|-
|align="center"|●||align="center"|●
|
|
|
|1.05
|24.66
|45
|-
|align="center"|●||align="center"|●
|
|
|
|1.06
|25.72
|47
|-
|align="center"|●||align="center"|●
|
|
|
|1.23
|26.95
|49
|- bgcolor="lightgrey"
|align="center"|｜  || align="center"| ｜
|
|
|
|1.02
|27.97
|
| Later opening due to land acquisition process
|-
|align="center"|●||align="center"|●
|
|
|
|2.05
|30.02
|53
|rowspan="7"| 30 Dec 2021
|-
|align="center"|●||align="center"|●
|
|
|
|1.16
|31.18
|56
|-
|align="center"|● || 
|
|
|
|1.86
|33.04
|58
|-
|align="center"|● ||
| 
|
|
|0.88
|33.92
|60
|-
|align="center"|● || 
| 
|
|
|1.49
|35.41
|63
|-
|align="center"|● || 
|
|
|
|1.28
|36.69
|65
|-
|align="center"|● || 
|
|
|
|1.49
|38.18
|67
|- style = "background:#; height: 2pt"
| colspan = "11" |
|-
| colspan = "11" |
|- style = "background: #; height: 2pt;"
| colspan = "11" |
|}

Important stations

Future expansion
Longju Road station will maybe open in 2040.

Headways

Technology

Rolling Stock

References

 
2021 establishments in China
Railway lines opened in 2021
Shanghai Metro lines